Eucallipterus is a genus of true bugs belonging to the family Aphididae.

The species of this genus are found in Europe, Australia and North America.

Species:
 Eucallipterus tiliae (Linnaeus, 1758)
 Eucallipterus tilicola

References

Aphididae